The 1962 FIFA World Cup final was the deciding match of the 1962 FIFA World Cup. The match was held at the Estadio Nacional in Santiago, and was contested by Czechoslovakia and Brazil. Brazil won the game 3–1 to record their second consecutive World Cup victory. Both teams had played each other during the group stage which ended in a goalless draw. This was the second World Cup final match featuring teams who had already competed against each other during the group stage (the first was the 1954 final between Hungary and West Germany). This event was on Sunday, June 17, 1962.

This was only the second successful defence of the World Cup title in the history of the competition (after Italy in 1938) in spite of the absence of one of the Brazil's star players of 1958, Pelé, who was ruled out of action after being injured during the second match of the tournament.

Match

Summary
After 15 minutes, Brazil again found themselves a goal behind in the World Cup final, as a long ball from Adolf Scherer was latched onto by Josef Masopust to put Czechoslovakia 1–0 ahead. However, just like the previous final four years earlier, Brazil soon hit back, equalising two minutes later through Amarildo after an error by the previously flawless Czechoslovak goalkeeper Viliam Schrojf. The Brazilians did not stop there and with goals from Zito and Vavá (another Schrojf error) midway through the second half, the Czechoslovaks could not get back into the game, with the match ending 3–1 to Brazil.

Details

References

External links
1962 FIFA World Cup Final planetworldcup.com

1
FIFA World Cup finals
1962
1962
Final
Final
1960s in Santiago, Chile
Sports competitions in Santiago
June 1962 sports events in South America